Pichai Buranasombati FRPSL (born 1944) is a Thai philatelist who was appointed to the Roll of Distinguished Philatelists in 2003. He is a fellow of the Royal Philatelic Society London and won a Grand Prix National award for his display of Straits Settlements 1624–1867 at the Singapore '95 World Stamp Exhibition.

References

Signatories to the Roll of Distinguished Philatelists
Pichai Buranasombati
Living people
Fellows of the Royal Philatelic Society London
1944 births
Philately of Malaysia